Aika (pronounced "ah-ee-kah" and stylized "AIKA") is a Japanese singer-songwriter, currently residing in Los Angeles, California, United States. She is known for her 2006 debut album Ai-Wo, with its songs "Orange Moon" and "Ai-wo", which reached the top 10 in Japanese charts on its first week of its release. Her second studio album was released in February 2017. In 2018, she released "Heard an Angel." She co-wrote the gold-certified song "Path of Independence" for her sister, Ayaka Hirahara.

Background 
Aika was born in Tokyo, Japan. Growing up, she played the piano and the saxophone. Her love for music led her to pursue a music degree at the Berklee College of Music in Boston. Shortly after completing her degree, she released her debut album Ai-Wo (through EMI records), which reached the top 10 on the Japanese radio charts. Her father, Makoto Hirahara, is a professional saxophonist, and her grandfather, Tsutomu Hirahara, is a professional trumpet player. Her sister, Ayaka Hirahara, is also a performer, signed to Universal Music Japan.

Performances and career 
Her performances include the Osaka "Act Against Aids" concert, JZ Brat and the Living Room in New York City. Her 2009 song "All He Has to Say" was produced to support Autism Speaks and was based on a poem by a teacher at the May Center for Child Development.

Aika has written and performed the original song “Dancing Arrows,” which was selected as the theme song for the Warner Brothers movie Ironclad. It is included on the EURORADIO's 2014 "Tune In" CD collection.

Aika also contributed the song "Solé" for the 2016 movie Whiskey Tango Foxtrot.

Discography

Studio albums

Compilation albums

Singles

Music videos

Movies

Career as a songwriter

Singles

Albums

Tours and live shows

AIKA tour and live shows

References 

Year of birth missing (living people)
Living people
Singers from Tokyo
21st-century Japanese women singers
21st-century Japanese singers